Miss Robin Hood is a 1952 British comedy film directed by John Guillermin, and starring Margaret Rutherford and Richard Hearne. Other actors involved include Dora Bryan, James Robertson Justice, Peter Jones, Sid James, Reg Varney, Kenneth Connor and Michael Medwin. The film features a variety of unusual camera work such as unexpected extreme close-ups and fast motion sequences.

Plot
A writer named Wrigley (Richard Hearne) creates a comic strip character named Miss Robin Hood for a children's story paper. It is a modernized retelling of the Robin Hood legend in which the heroine robs banks with the assistance of a gang of teenage girls and then redistributes the money.

Unfortunately the cartoon is dropped from the paper, and Wrigley leaves his job. However, Miss Honey (Margaret Rutherford), who is director of a home for the orphans of London in Hampstead, recruits Wrigley to carry out a little light safebreaking, believing that he has such skills because he created Miss Robin Hood. Difficulties arise when Scotland Yard becomes involved.

Cast

Production
Disney were making The Story of Robin Hood and were reportedly unhappy that the Group 3 Film could be confused with theirs. Filming took place in June 1952.

Critical reception
The Monthly Film Bulletin called it "a haphazard mixture of farce and fantasy... this slapdash and undergraduatish piece."

Bosley Crowther of The New York Times wrote, "Even with stalwart Margaret Rutherford playing the principal role—that of a good-natured looney—in this utterly slap-happy film, and even with several cheering flashes of tomfoolery to light the way, the whole thing is just a bit too labored—too fatuous—to be continuous fun."

Graeme Clark of the website The Spinning Image wrote, "It's all very fluffy and inconsequential, but with Patrick Campbell contributing to the script and this array of talent in front of the camera, vintage Brit comedy fans are well catered for."

Filmink said "It has a decent enough central idea... but it doesn’t have enough faith in the idea, so all this other extraneous stuff is added."

External links 
 
 
Miss Robin Hood at TCMDB
Complete film at Internet Archive

References

1952 films
1952 comedy films
British comedy films
Films directed by John Guillermin
Robin Hood films
Robin Hood parodies
Fictional comics
Films set in London
Films about comics
British black-and-white films
Films shot at Southall Studios
1950s English-language films
1950s British films